is a Japanese manga series written and illustrated by Minene Sakurano which was serialized in the monthly magazine Shōnen GanGan from 1996 to 2000. A continuation was published in Comic Blade titled  from 2002 to 2005. The manga was adapted into a 22-episode anime television series produced by Toei Animation which aired from 1998 throughout 1999. An eight-episode OVA series,  Denshin Mamotte Shugogetten was released in 2000.

The story involves Tasuke Shichiri, a 14-year-old boy that receives a gift from his father, Tarousuke, who is traveling in China. The gift is a ring, the shitenrin, and those pure of heart may gaze into it and receive a moon goddess named Shaolin.

An English adaptation of the first manga was serialized in Raijin Comics under the English title Guardian Angel Getten. TOKYOPOP later licensed the manga under its original title, which began publication in April 2008.  But Mamotte Shugogetten Retrouvailles has yet to be released in English.

Characters

A moon spirit who wears traditional styled costumes, she has little understanding of the human world after spending a few thousand years in the confines of the shitenrin. Throughout the anime her purpose is to protect Tasuke and she does so by summoning different assistants called Hoshigami (星神, literally "star gods") through the ring. She initially causes trouble for Tasuke by destroying harmless household objects in her efforts to protect him. She is banned from going to the school after destroying some of it. Because of this, Shaorin sends Rishu to protect Tasuke at school. In the manga her misguided efforts to protect him the first day cause Tasuke to order her to go away, saying that he can protect himself. A bit later she apologizes and asks his permission to protect him from loneliness. On that basis the manga continues. She develops feelings for Tasuke and gets jealous when Kaori shows up in anime episode 12 and in the last 2 episodes, she finally realizes what she feels for Tasuke. In the manga, as a spirit, she profoundly does not understand these feelings. Her guardian, the hoshigami Nankyuko-Jusei, counsels her that these are feelings that she should not learn. He means that it will make eternity harder for her when she must part from Tasuke. Her given name might be Rin, with "Shao-" being an affectionate suffix. Vol 5 of the manga shows that people casually familiar with her think that she's an ordinary person and her family name (last name) is "Shugogetten". She is voiced by Mariko Kouda

The main character. He is a high school (middle school in the manga)  student, son of a globe trotting archeologist father. Because his father and older sister travel and his mother left for a global trip when he was just a baby. he lives alone in his two-story home at the beginning of the story. He is decisive and intelligent, but nonetheless beleaguered and is a similar character to Keiichi Morisato in both personality and situation. He has a crush on Shaorin just after he first meets her and his feelings for her develop even more throughout the series. Tasuke wishes to save Shao, though he is very uncertain how to save her or from what to save her. He is voiced by Daisuke Sakaguchi

Freed by Tasuke from a wand artifact, the kokutentou found in the same area as the shitenrin and sent to Tasuke by his father. Ruuan's role as opposed to Shaorin's is not to protect Tasuke but instead to make him happy which she does by giving inanimate objects life to do her bidding. In the manga she gets herself a job as Tasuke's homeroom teacher. Ruuan and Shao are sworn rivals and conflict often occurs as their roles of keeping Tasuke "safe" or "happy" aren't always equivalent. She too fall in loves with Tasuke, however she takes a stronger approach, often trying to have sex with him. Rūan voiced by Yumi Takada

The tiny, pink-haired, telepathic hoshigami of Shaorin that is given to Tasuke when he attends school. She also takes most responsibility for keeping the house clean and is called the "garbage gnome" by Ruuan. She is unable to speak at an audible volume to Tasuke so she communicates by drawing cartoons on palm cards with a paintbrush. She has a cute way of speaking, which includes saying "deshi" instead of "desu" and calling Tasuke "Tasuke-shama".

Freed from a small Chinese fan, also sent by Tasuke's father. She is an earth spirit and her role is to put her master through trials by making things grow to several times their normal size.  In the manga she is first seen in chapter 39. In the animation, she only appears in the Denshin Mamotte Shugogetten OVA.  Her stock phrase is "It is a challenge.  <Verb> it."  When asked to tell a bit more about herself she replied "It is a challenge.  Look it up."  (Shao answered and explained it to Tasuke). Kiryu voiced by Houko Kuwashima (OVA)

A man from the local Shinto shrine who is in love with Shaorin. In the manga he also runs the school store, which provides more opportunity to see Shaorin and participate in stories. He is aware of Shaorin's nature. He has the cool, cheerful look whenever he is near cute girls, but has an evil look towards the boys, making the guys suggest he has a split-personality. He is also not above using underhanded tactics to try to get Shaorin, where once he realized she was in love with Tasuke, he tried to manipulate her lack of understanding towards these feelings into the belief that it was guilt, overall suggesting that she should leave him as she sees herself as a burden to Tasuke. He is voiced by Toshiyuki Morikawa.

 and 

Tasuke's classmates. Kouichirou is in love with Ruuan and Takashi is in love with Shaorin. They are aware of Shaorin's nature. Kouichiro voiced by Omi Minami and Takashi voiced by Ryōtarō Okiayu.

A student at Tasuke's school. She is one year behind Tasuke at the school which they attend. She is jealous of Shaorin and Ruuan and feels they are rivals to win Tasuke's heart. She first meets Tasuke in the anime after she wishes to Kami (God) that she will meet the man of her dreams and she falls immediately in love with Tasuke when he saves her from tripping over. In the manga early in her first term at the school, on a rainy day, Tasuke sees that she doesn't have an umbrella and lends her his, forgetting for the moment that Shaorin and Ruuan aren't at the school that day and can't replace his umbrella. She develops a big crush on Tasuke and it keeps getting enlarged by inadvertent accidents. She is voiced by Eriko Hara.

She starts out as a delinquent girl, but after befriending Shaorin, Shouko decides to try to bring her and Tasuke together. Her personality softens up after she meets Shaorin and it is seen that she becomes sensitive when it comes to understanding Tasuke and Shaorin's relationship. She is aware of Shaorin's nature. She has an odd habit of being able to appear anywhere, as well as enjoys playing "matchmaker" solely because of all the entertainment she gets from the situation. She is voiced by Nami Miyahara.

Tasuke's older sister, a world traveler.  In chapter 16 she comes home.  Tasuke tries to conceal all the spirits from his sister, while Ruuan tries to reveal Shao, in hopes that older sister will kick Shao out of the house.  Nana is favorably impressed by Shao.  When she leaves again in chapter 17 she asks Shao to stay with and look after Tasuke.  In chapter 51 she comes home again, bringing with her another woman named Sayuri, whom she had found on a sickbed in Mongolia.  Nana thinks, correctly, that Sayuri is their mother.  Sayuri leaves in chapter 52, but Nana stays.  She is irked with Tasuke because he hadn't told her that Shao isn't human.  She then fills much of the pot-stirrer role that Ruuan has filled up till now.  Factoid: Nana and Izumo had attended the same middle school.

The father of Tasuke and Nana.

{{nihongo|Sayuri Shichiri|七梨 さゆり|Shichiri Sayuri}}

The mother of Tasuke and Nana.

MusicAnime television seriesOVA'''

References

External links

  Official website
 Tokyopop website
 

1996 manga
1998 anime television series debuts
2000 anime OVAs
2002 manga
Mag Garden manga
Gangan Comics manga
Shōnen manga
Toei Animation television
TV Asahi original programming
Toei Animation original video animation